40th London Film Critics' Circle Awards
30 January 2020

Film of the Year:
Parasite

British/Irish Film of the Year:
The Souvenir

The 40th London Film Critics' Circle Awards, honouring the best in film for 2019, were announced by the London Film Critics' Circle on 30 January 2020 at The May Fair Hotel, in Mayfair, London. The nominations were announced on 17 December 2019. The event was hosted by actor and writer Sally Phillips.

Winners and nominees
Winners are listed first and highlighted with boldface.

{| class="wikitable"
|-
! style="background:#EEDD82;| Film of the Year
! style="background:#EEDD82;| Director of the Year
|-
| valign="top" |
 Parasite
 1917
 The Irishman
 Joker
 Knives Out
 Marriage Story
 Midsommar
 Pain and Glory
 Portrait of a Lady on Fire
 The Souvenir
| valign="top" |
 Bong Joon-ho – Parasite
 Pedro Almodóvar – Pain and Glory
 Sam Mendes – 1917
 Céline Sciamma – Portrait of a Lady on Fire
 Martin Scorsese – The Irishman
|-
! style="background:#EEDD82;| Actor of the Year
! style="background:#EEDD82;| Actress of the Year
|-
| valign="top" |
 Joaquin Phoenix – Joker
 Antonio Banderas – Pain and Glory
 Tom Burke – The Souvenir
 Robert De Niro – The Irishman
 Adam Driver – Marriage Story
| valign="top" |
 Renée Zellweger – Judy
 Scarlett Johansson – Marriage Story
 Lupita Nyong'o – Us
 Florence Pugh – Midsommar
 Charlize Theron – Bombshell
|-
! style="background:#EEDD82;| Supporting Actor of the Year
! style="background:#EEDD82;| Supporting Actress of the Year
|-
| valign="top" |
 Joe Pesci – The Irishman
 Tom Hanks – A Beautiful Day in the Neighborhood
 Shia LaBeouf – Honey Boy
 Al Pacino – The Irishman
 Brad Pitt – Once Upon a Time in Hollywood
| valign="top" |
 Laura Dern – Marriage Story
 Jennifer Lopez – Hustlers
 Florence Pugh – Little Women
 Margot Robbie – Bombshell
 Tilda Swinton – The Souvenir
|-
! style="background:#EEDD82;| Screenwriter of the Year
! style="background:#EEDD82;| Foreign Language Film of the Year
|-
| valign="top" |
 Noah Baumbach – Marriage Story
 Pedro Almodóvar – Pain and Glory
 Joanna Hogg – The Souvenir
 Bong Joon-ho and Han Jin-won – Parasite
 Steven Zaillian – The Irishman
| valign="top" |
 Portrait of a Lady on Fire
 Happy as Lazzaro
 Monos
 Pain and Glory
 Parasite
|-
! style="background:#EEDD82;| Documentary of the Year
! style="background:#EEDD82;| British/Irish Film of the Year
|-
| valign="top" |
 For Sama
 Amazing Grace
 Apollo 11
 The Cave
 Varda by Agnès
| valign="top" |
 The Souvenir
 1917
 Bait
 Rocketman
 Wild Rose
|-
! style="background:#EEDD82;| British/Irish Actor of the Year
! style="background:#EEDD82;| British/Irish Actress of the Year
|-
| valign="top" |
 Robert Pattinson – High Life, The King, and The Lighthouse
 Tom Burke – The Souvenir
 Taron Egerton – Rocketman
 George MacKay – 1917, Ophelia, and Where Hands Touch
 Jonathan Pryce – The Two Popes
| valign="top" |
 Florence Pugh – Fighting with My Family, Little Women, and Midsommar
 Jessie Buckley – Judy and Wild Rose
 Cynthia Erivo – Harriet
 Lesley Manville – Maleficent: Mistress of Evil and Ordinary Love
 Saoirse Ronan – Little Women
|-
! style="background:#EEDD82;| Young British/Irish Performer of the Year
! style="background:#EEDD82;| Breakthrough British/Irish Filmmaker of the Year
|-
| valign="top" |
 Honor Swinton Byrne – The Souvenir Raffey Cassidy – Vox Lux
 Dean-Charles Chapman – 1917, Blinded by the Light, and The King
 Roman Griffin Davis – Jojo Rabbit
 Noah Jupe – Ford v Ferrari and Honey Boy
| valign="top" |
 Mark Jenkin – Bait Waad Al-Kateab and Edward Watts – For Sama
 Richard Billingham – Ray & Liz
 Owen McCafferty – Ordinary Love
 Nicole Taylor – Wild Rose
|-
! style="background:#EEDD82;| British/Irish Short Film of the Year
! style="background:#EEDD82;| Technical Achievement Award
|-
| valign="top" |
 The Devil's Harmony Appreciation
 Beyond the North Winds: A Post-Nuclear Reverie
 Kingdom, Come
 Pompeii
| valign="top" |
 Barbara Ling – Once Upon a Time in Hollywood, production design'' Will Becher and Richard Phelan – A Shaun the Sheep Movie: Farmageddon, animation
 Jacqueline Durran – Little Women, costume design
 Lee Ha-jun – Parasite, production design
 Allen Maris – Ad Astra, visual effects
 Todd Douglas Miller – Apollo 11, film editing
 Daniel Pemberton – Motherless Brooklyn, music
 Oliver Tarney – 1917, sound design
 Jasper Wolf – Monos, cinematography
 Jeremy Woodhead – Judy, makeup and hair
|}

Special awards

The Dilys Powell Award for Excellence in Film
 Sally Potter Sandy PowellThe 40th Anniversary Award
 Aardman'''

References

2
2019 film awards
2019 in British cinema
2019 in London
January 2020 events in the United Kingdom
2019 awards in the United Kingdom